Jalan Terbaik is the debut album Indonesia band ST 12, released on September 7, 2005. The album contains 10 songs, including the singles "Aku Tak Sanggup Lagi", "Rasa Yang Tertinggal", and "Aku Masih Sayang". This was the only album by the band that included the work of guitarist Iman Rush, who was killed in a traffic accident in October 2005.

Track listing 
 ATSL (Aku Tak Sanggup Lagi)
 Rasa Yang Tertinggal
 Ruang Hidup
 Aku Masih Sayang
 Kepedihan Jiwa
 Cinta Abadi
 Sirna Sudah
 Dewiku
 Jiwa Yang Hilang
 Jalan Terbaik

Personnel
Credits for Jalan Terbaik adapted from album liner notes.
 Charly van Houten – vocal (all tracks)
 Pepeng – rhythm guitar (all tracks)
 Iman Rush – lead guitar (all tracks)
 Pepep – drum, recorded (all tracks except "Cinta Abadi")
 Iman Gaia – keyboard
 Arista – backing vocal
 Indra Utopia – bass guitar
 Andry Mandera – mixed & mastered
 Openg – recorded
 ST 12 – songwriter & arrangement
 Hendry Helmy – producer
 Helmy Aziz – executive producer

Trivia Behind of Album Jalan Terbaik
 Iman Rush really involved in the cultivation album and overall recording sessions
 Pepep only be played rhythm guitar in throughout the song
 Actually, all of the songs on this album is the result of Iman Rush's arrangement itself, not the results of other personnel arrangement
 Pepep appointed to Andry Mandera as a studio engineer during recording and mixing
 The album was produced by Hendy Helmy, Pepep's brother
 Distribution of albums funded by (alm) Helmy Aziz, Pepep's father
 Charly awkward for the first time entered the studio to work on the first track
 The album become popular in once year after since the death of Iman Rush
 The video clip "Aku Tak Sanggup Lagi (ATSL)" in the 3 months to shooting before the death of Iman Rush

References

ST 12 albums
2006 albums